Ionuț Alexandru Oprescu (born 5 June 2003) is a Romanian professional footballer who plays as a midfielder for Liga III side Real Bradu.

References

External links
 

2003 births
Living people
Footballers from Bucharest
Romanian footballers
Association football midfielders
Liga I players
FC Argeș Pitești players
Liga III players